Gorb is a surname. Notable people with the surname include:

Sergei Gorb (born 1954), Russian footballer and coach
Tatiana Gorb (1935–2013), Russian Soviet artist, daughter of Vladimir
Vladimir Gorb (1903–1988), Russian Soviet artist

See also
Gord (given name)
Gore (surname)